Robert John Zimny (December 11, 1921 – August 11, 2011) was an American football tackle who played two seasons with the Chicago Cardinals of the National Football League (NFL). He was drafted by the Brooklyn Tigers in the 28th round of the 1944 NFL Draft. He played college football at Indiana University and attended St. Rita of Cascia High School in Chicago, Illinois. He was a member of the Chicago Cardinals team that won the 1947 NFL Championship.

References

External links
Just Sports Stats

1921 births
2011 deaths
Players of American football from Chicago
American football tackles
Indiana Hoosiers football players
Chicago Cardinals players
American people of Slavic descent